Garbagna Novarese is a comune (municipality) in the Province of Novara in the Italian region Piedmont, located about  northeast of Turin and about  southeast of Novara.

Garbagna Novarese borders the following municipalities: Nibbiola, Novara, Sozzago, Terdobbiate, and Trecate.

Name origin

It was mentioned for the first time in various documents dating back to between 840 and 1150, as Carpania. By the linguistic phenomena of lenition and first-type anaphonesis, since 1150 also names Garbania and Garbagna began to be used, while since 1367 only the latter has remained.

On 31 May 1863 it was officially renamed from Garbagna to Garbagna Novarese, to distinguish it from Garbagna d'Alessandria. Curiously, in some official documents it is repeatedly called Garbagno.

References

Cities and towns in Piedmont